Gladys Coburn was an actress in theater and films. She had starring roles during the silent film era including in the 1917 film The Primitive Call and the 1920 film Heart Strings. She also performed in theatrical productions.

Her appearance was described as being similar to June Caprice.

Gladys was born on August 22, 1893, in Arkansas. She lived most of her life in New Castle, Indiana. She died in January 1969 at the age of 75.

Filmography
Madame X (1916) as Helene
The Primitive Call (1917) as Betty Malcolm
The Firing Line (1919) as Jessie Bradley
The Fatal Hour (1920 film) as Dorothy Gore
Voices (1920) as Marion Lord
 Out of the Snows (1920)
Heart Strings (1920) as Kathleen Noyes
God's Crucible as Marjorie Menzies
The Battle of Life

References

External links

Gladys Coburn at Internet Broadway Database

1948 deaths
Actresses from Evanston, Illinois